Marum may refer to:

People
 Edward Marum (1822-1890), an Irish politician
 Ludwig Marum (1885–1934), a German politician
 Martin van Marum (1750-1837), a Dutch scientist
 John Dillon (comedian), born John Daily Marum (1831-1913), a US comedian

Other
Marum, a town in the Netherlands
Marum (volcano), a volcano in Vanuatu
 Marum, a name for the herbs Teucrium marum and Thymus mastichina
 Marum, one of the Thai names for trees of the Moringa genus (Also known as ma-kon-kom or pak-e-hum in Thailand)
Marum, the Third Heaven according to Shi'ite sources